Hanušovce nad Topľou  is a town in the Vranov nad Topľou District, Prešov Region in eastern Slovakia, near the Topľa river.

History
The first written record about the town was in 1332 under name Hanusa.

Geography

Demographics
According to the 2001 census, the town had 3,582 inhabitants. 85.01% of inhabitants were Slovaks, 14.27% Roma and 0.20% Ukrainians. The religious makeup was 53.41% Roman Catholics, 36.63% Lutherans, 5.19% Greek Catholics and 1.31% people with no religious affiliation.
According to the 2011 census, the town had 3,741 inhabitants. 2,961 of inhabitants were Slovaks, 641 Roma and 139 others and unspecified.

Twin towns — sister cities
Hanušovce nad Topľou is twinned with:

  Dębica, Poland
  Nozdrzec, Poland
  Velká Bíteš, Czech Republic

See also
 List of municipalities and towns in Slovakia

References

Genealogical resources
The records for genealogical research are available at the state archive "Statny Archiv in Presov, Slovakia"
 Roman Catholic church records (births/marriages/deaths): 1853-1910 (parish A)
 Greek Catholic church records (births/marriages/deaths): 1847-1939 (parish B)
 Lutheran church records (births/marriages/deaths): 1810-1896 (parish A)

External links
 
 
Surnames of living people in Hanusovce nad Toplou

Cities and towns in Slovakia
Šariš